Kotowicz is a Polish and Jewish surname. Notable people with the surname include:

Grzegorz Kotowicz (born 1973), Polish canoeist
Irene Kotowicz (1919-2002), All-American Girls Professional Baseball League player
Robert Kotowicz, Polish commemorative coins designer (see 1, 2, 3, 4, 5)

Fictional characters:
Janusz Kotowicz, character in the novel Ashes and Diamonds

Polish-language surnames